Hardi Pardaillan! is a 1964 French-Italian adventure film directed by Bernard Borderie and starring Gérard Barray, Valérie Lagrange, Philippe Lemaire, Sophie Hardy, and Guy Delorme. It was also known as The Gallant Musketeer.

Cast
 Gérard Barray as Pardaillan 
 Valérie Lagrange - Bianca Farnèse 
 Philippe Lemaire - The Duke of Angoulême 
 Guy Delorme -  Maurevert 
 Sophie Hardy
 Jean Topart -  The Duke of Guise
 Jacques Castelot - Henri III
 Caroline Rami - Rousotte.
 Robert Berri - Gueule d'mour

Release
Hardi Pardaillan! was shown in Italy on 29 February 1964 and in France on 8 April 1964.

References

External links

1964 films
French historical adventure films
Italian historical adventure films
1960s French-language films
1964 adventure films

French swashbuckler films 
Films directed by Bernard Borderie
Films set in the 16th century
French sequel films
Italian swashbuckler films
1960s French films
1960s Italian films